Erhan Namlı (born 7 May 1974 in Ankara) is a Turkish footballer who plays as a midfielder for Çankırı Belediye Spor in the TFF Second League.

Namlı previously played for Trabzonspor, Galatasaray S.K., Eskişehirspor and Adana Demirspor.

References

1974 births
Living people
Turkish footballers
Adana Demirspor footballers
Eskişehirspor footballers
Trabzonspor footballers
Galatasaray S.K. footballers

Association football midfielders